Plecing ayam is a chicken dish, from Lombok in Indonesia.  The chicken is sliced and baked, then marinaded in oil, chili pepper, garlic, spring onions, shrimp paste and limes, and finally grilled.

See also
 List of chicken dishes

Indonesia
Ayam kecap recipe can be cooked dry and some are gravy, depending on taste and seasoning used.

References

Indonesian chicken dishes
Baked foods